Springtime for the World is the fifth album by British band The Blow Monkeys, released in 1990. The work represented the band's ultimate transformation into a dance music act, a direction the band had been gradually moving since their biggest hit single, "It Doesn't Have to Be This Way" (number 5 in the UK Singles Chart in 1987), and the album it was taken from, She Was Only a Grocer's Daughter.

The album's title track, "Springtime for the World", reached number 69 in the UK Singles Chart.

Track listing
All tracks composed by Dr. Robert (Robert Howard); except where noted
 "In Too Deep" – 4:33 
 "Springtime for the World" – 3:25 
 "Vibe Alive!" – 2:50 
 "Reflections '89" – 2:57 
 "Be Not Afraid" (Robert Howard, Cheb Khaled) - 6:54
 "If You Love Somebody" – 5:08 
 "La Passionara" – 4:43 
 "Let the People Dance" – 3:43 
 "Fruits of the Earth" – 4:43 
 "As the Dust Settles" – 6:02 
 "Checking Out" – 4:56 [CD/MC only]
 "The Other Side of You" (Howard, Kiley, Anker, Henry) - 4:38 [CD only]

Singles taken from the album
 "Springtime for the World" (1990) (UK Singles Chart no. 69)
 "La Passionara" [Remix] (1990)
 "If You Love Somebody" [Remix] (1990)

The Springtime for the World EP
The three songs above were also released on a joint double A-side four-track EP, collectively entitled Springtime for the World, featuring two alternative versions of "If You Love Somebody".

 (A1)  "Springtime for the World"
 (A2)  "La Passionara"
 (AA1) "If You Love Somebody" [Musto & Bones 12"]
 (AA2) "If You Love Somebody" [Musto & Bones Dub]

Personnel
The Blow Monkeys
Dr. Robert – vocals, piano, guitar
Mick Anker – bass guitar
Neville Henry – saxophone
Tony Kiley – drums

Other musicians
Cheb Khaled – lead vocals (track 5)
Barbara Snow – trumpet and brass arrangement (track 5)
Brian Bethell – guitar
Sylvia Mason, Mary Cassidy – background vocals
Simon Watson – Spanish guitar (track 7)

Production
Dr. Robert and Hector for Springtime for the World Productions – production
Andy Mason – engineering
Ritchie Fermie for Bamn Productions – remix (track 8)
Tommy Musto & Frankie Bones for Northcott/JSE Productions – additional production and mix (tracks AA1, AA2)
Mike Rodgers – mix engineering (tracks AA1, AA2) at "D&D Studios", New York City

Staff
Kate Garner – photography
Paul McGarvey, Katie & Deirdre – RCA personnel

Release details
Album

Maxi-single

References

External links
Springtime for the World at Discogs

1990 albums
The Blow Monkeys albums